Erich Schumann (5 January 1898 – 25 April 1985) was a German physicist who specialized in acoustics and explosives, and had a penchant for music. He was a general officer in the army and a professor at the University of Berlin and the Technical University of Berlin. When Adolf Hitler came to power he joined the Nazi Party.  During World War II, his positions in the Army Ordnance Office and the Army High Command made him one of the most powerful and influential physicists in Germany. He ran the German nuclear energy program from 1939 to 1942, when the army relinquished control to the Reich Research Council. His role in the project was obfuscated after the war by the German physics community's defense of its conduct during the war. The publication of his book on the military's role in the project was not allowed by the British occupation authorities. He was director of the Helmholtz Institute of Sound Psychology and Medical Acoustics.

Education

Schumann was born in Potsdam, Brandenburg. He studied at the Frederick William University (today the Humboldt University of Berlin) under the acoustician and musicologist Carl Stumpf and the physicist Max Planck. In 1922, he received his doctorate there in systematic musicology (acoustics). He completed his Habilitation on acoustics there in 1929; members of his Habilitation committee for experimental and theoretical physics included the eminent scientists Walther Nernst, Max von Laue, and Max Planck .

Career

Overview

From 1922, Schumann was a physicist at the Reichswehrministerium (RWM, Reich Ministry of Defense), which became the Reichskriegsministerium (RKM, Reich Ministry of War) in 1939. He passed the Referendar (civil service exam) in 1926. From 1929, he was head of the RWM Central Science Office and from 1932 ministerial councilor there.

In 1929, when he completed his Habilitation at the University of Berlin, he was appointed lecturer of systematic musicology (acoustics). In 1931, he became an extraordinarius professor of experimental and theoretical physics there, and in 1933 he became an ordinarius professor of applied physics and systematic musicology. Schumann taught courses on acoustics and explosives, his areas of research. Schumann was the doctoral advisor to Wernher von Braun, who was awarded his doctorate in 1934.

In 1933, the year Adolf Hitler came to power, Schumann became a member of the Nazi Party.

From 1933 until 1945, Schumann was director of the newly established Physics Department II of the University of Berlin, which was commissioned by the Oberkommando des Heeres (OKW, Army High Command) to conduct research projects they funded. Concurrently, from 1934, he was head of the research department for the Heereswaffenamt (HWA, Army Ordnance Office) and assistant secretary in the Science Department of the RKM, then from 1938 to 1945 of the OKW. Additionally, in the autumn of 1938, he was appointed an ordinarius professor of ballistics and military technology at the Technische Hochschule Berlin (today the Technical University of Berlin). From 1942 to 1945, he was on the Reichsforschungsrat (RFR, Reich Research Council) and was also the  Bevollmächtiger (plenipotentiary) for high explosives.

Schumann, a general officer in the army and an ordinarius professor in academia, skillfully projected his power as a science policymaker for Germany. He enjoyed both roles, as remembered by the nuclear physicist Georg Hartwig, and dressed appropriately to gain advantage. For example, when he met with academia representatives, he wore his military uniform and saluted. When meeting with military officials, he dressed in mufti and was introduced as Herr Professor Doktor.

Uranverein

From September 1939 to 1942 the HWA controlled the German nuclear energy project, also known at the Uranverein (Uranium Club); in 1942 control was turned over to the RFR. The most influential people in the project were Schumann, Abraham Esau, Walther Gerlach, and Kurt Diebner, Schumann, during this period, was one of the most powerful and influential physicists in Germany.

When it was apparent that the nuclear energy project would not make a decisive contribution to ending the war effort in the near term by producing a nuclear weapon, the HWA had decided by January 1942 to relinquish its control of the nuclear energy project and leave it in the realm of research through the RFR. Even then, Schumann helped the project dodge what would have been a major blow to the project. Many scientists in the Uranverein working on the Uranmaschine (uranium machine, i.e., nuclear reactor) had the classification of unabkömmlich (uk, indispensable) and were exempt from being drafted into armed service. Both Paul Harteck and Carl Friedrich von Weizsäcker had the classification uk. However, as the war raged on, the demand for men to provide armed service caused both to be called up in January 1942 for service at the Russian front. Paul O. Müller and Karl-Heinz Höcker, colleagues of von Weizsäcker within the Uranverein had already been called up; Müller was killed on the Russian front. Werner Heisenberg, with the help of Schuman and Karl-Friedrich Bonhoeffer, whose brother-in-law Hans von Dohnanyi held an influential position in the German army, managed to maintain the uk status for Harteck and von Weizsäcker and keep them working on the nuclear energy project.

Biological Warfare

Although Hitler had ordered that biological warfare should be studied only for the purpose of defending against it, Schumann lobbied for him to be persuaded otherwise: "America must be attacked simultaneously with various human and animal epidemic pathogens, as well as plant pests." The plans were never adopted due to opposition by Hitler.

Post World War II

In the German scientific community's defense of its conduct during the war, the military's Schumann- and Diebner-led aspects of the Uranverein were minimized, ridiculed, and ascribed to Nichtskönner (incompetent scientists) and leadership that owed its positions to politics. Additionally, the Heisenberg component of the project was made to appear as the leading and dominant element of the project. The motivations of the German scientists were to distance themselves from the military aspects of the Uranverein and, in the denazification environment, also distance themselves from those who had visible positions under National Socialism. Regarding Schumann's scientific abilities, they are, however, attested to by the fact that members of his Habilitation committee for experimental and theoretical physics at the University of Berlin included the eminent scientists Max von Laue, Walther Nernst, and Max Planck, and the Habilitation was well before Hitler came to power.

After the war, Schumann wrote a book to get out his view of the German nuclear energy project, but publication was blocked by the British occupation authorities. Telling of some of the story from this perspective would have to wait until his right-hand man in the HWA, Kurt Diebner, published his book in 1957.

Again from 1951, Schumann was director of the Helmholtz Institute of Sound Psychology and Medical Acoustics in Berlin. He died in Homberg-Hülsa in 1985.

Notes

References

Bernstein, Jeremy Hitler’s Uranium Club: The Secret Recording’s at Farm Hall (Copernicus, 2001) 
Beyerchen, Alan D. Scientists Under Hitler: Politics and the Physics Community in the Third Reich (Yale, 1977) 
David C. Cassidy Uncertainty: The Life and Science of Werner Heisenberg (W. H. Freeman and Company, 1992)
Dieter Bagge, Kurt Diebner, and Kenneth Jay Von der Uranspaltung bis Calder Hall (Rowohlt Taschenbuch Verlag, 1957)
Goudsmit, Samuel A. War Physics in Germany, The Review of Scientific Instruments, Volume 17, Number 1, Announcements, 49-52 (January 1946). Also see an annotated reprint, Document 111 Samuel A. Goudsmit: War Physics in Germany [January 1946] in Hentschel, Klaus (editor) and Ann M. Hentschel (editorial assistant and translator) Physics and National Socialism: An Anthology of Primary Sources (Birkhäuser, 1996) 345–352.
Goudsmit, Samuel A. German Scientists in Army Employment I – The Case Analyzed, Letters to the Editor Bulletin of the Atomic Scientists Volume 3, Number 2, 64-67 (February 1947). Also see an annotated reprint, Document 112 Samuel A. Goudsmit: German Scientists in Army Employment I – The Case Analyzed [February 1947] in Hentschel, Klaus (editor) and Ann M. Hentschel (editorial assistant and translator) Physics and National Socialism: An Anthology of Primary Sources (Birkhäuser, 1996) 352–356.
Samuel A. Goudsmit Nazis’ Atomic Secrets. The Chief of a Top-Secret U.S. Wartime Mission Tells How and Why German Science Failed in the International Race to Produce the Bomb, Life Volume23, 123-134 (October 20, 1947). Also see an annotated reprint, Document 116 Samuel A. Goudsmit: Nazis’ Atomic Secrets. The Chief of a Top-Secret U.S. Wartime Mission Tells How and Why German Science Failed in the International Race to Produce the Bomb [October 20, 1947] in Hentschel, Klaus (editor) and Ann M. Hentschel (editorial assistant and translator) Physics and National Socialism: An Anthology of Primary Sources (Birkhäuser, 1996) 379–392.
Goudsmit, Samuel Alsos (Tomash, second printing, 1986) [The first Tomash printing was in 1983. Originally, the book was published by Henry Schuman Publishers in 1947.]
Heisenberg, Werner Research in Germany on the Technical Applications of Atomic Energy, Nature Volume 160, Number 4059, 211-215 (August 16, 1947). See also the annotated version: Document 115. Werner Heisenberg: Research in Germany on the Technical Application of Atomic Energy [August 16, 1947] in Hentschel, Klaus (editor) and Ann M. Hentschel (editorial assistant and translator) Physics and National Socialism: An Anthology of Primary Sources (Birkhäuser, 1996) 361–397. These are slightly abridged translations of the following paper: Werner Heisenberg Über die Arbeiten zur technischen Ausnutzung der Atomkernenergie in Deustchaland, Die Naturwissenschaften Volume 33, 325-329 (1946).
Hentschel, Klaus (editor) and Ann M. Hentschel (editorial assistant and translator) Physics and National Socialism: An Anthology of Primary Sources (Birkhäuser, 1996) . [This book is a collection of 121 primary German documents relating to physics under National Socialism. The documents have been translated and annotated, and there is a lengthy introduction to put them into perspective.]
 Klaus Hentschel The Mental Aftermath: The Mentality of German Physicists 1945 – 1949 (Oxford, 2007)
Kant, Horst Werner Heisenberg and the German Uranium Project / Otto Hahn and the Declarations of Mainau and Göttingen, Preprint 203 (Max-Planck Institut für Wissenschaftsgeschichte, 2002)
Rainer Karlsch Hitlers Bombe, 2005, Munic, DVA, 
Rainer Karlsch, Heiko Petermann Editor Fuer und Wider Hitlers Bombe, 2007 Waxmann Verlag Munster/New York, 
Macrakis, Kristie Surviving the Swastika: Scientific Research in Nazi Germany (Oxford, 1993)
 Günter Nagel:  " Atomversuche in Deutschland " 2002 Heinrich Jung Verlagsges.mbH Zella-Mehlis  
 Günter Nagel: " Wissenschaft für den krieg "   2012  Franz Steiner Verlag Stuttgart  
Powers, Thomas Heisenberg’s War: The Secret History of the German Bomb (Knopf, 1993)
Schumann, Erich Wehrmacht und Froschung in Richard Donnevert (editor) Wehrmacht und Partei second expanded edition, (Barth, 1939) 133–151. See also the annotated English translation: Document 75. Erich Schumann: Armed Forces and Research [1939] in Hentschel, Klaus (editor) and Ann M. Hentschel (editorial assistant and translator) Physics and National Socialism: An Anthology of Primary Sources (Birkhäuser, 1996) 207–220.
Walker, Mark German National Socialism and the Quest for Nuclear Power 1939–1949 (Cambridge, 1993) 
Walker, Mark Nazi Science: Myth, Truth, and the German Atomic Bomb (Perseus, 1995)
Walker, Mark Eine Waffenschmiede? Kernwaffen- und Reaktorforschung am Kaiser-Wilhelm-Institut für Physik, Forschungsprogramm „Geschichte der Kaiser-Wilhelm-Gesellschaft im Nationalsozialismus“ Ergebnisse 26 (2005)

1898 births
1985 deaths
Scientists from Potsdam
People from the Province of Brandenburg
Humboldt University of Berlin alumni
Academic staff of the Humboldt University of Berlin
Technical University of Berlin alumni
Nuclear program of Nazi Germany
20th-century German physicists